Un Chau Estate, or Un Chau Street Estate before redevelopment, is a public housing estate on the reclaimed land of Cheung Sha Wan, Kowloon, Hong Kong, located between  and Cheung Sha Wan Road, next to MTR Cheung Sha Wan station. It consists of 10 residential buildings completed in 1998, 1999 and 2008, which were developed into 4 phases. Phase 5 was developed on the site of the former Cheung Sha Wan Factory Estate.

Background
Un Chau Street Estate had 8 residential blocks completed in 1969, but all the blocks were demolished in 1990s and 2000s, and replaced by new-typed buildings. The redeveloped estate was renamed as "Un Chau Estate". Phase 1 and 3 consists of 6 residential buildings (a building for senior citizens included) and a shopping centre, which were completed between 1998 and 1999. Phase 2 and 4 consists of 5 residential buildings completed in 2008.

Phase 5 is on the site of the former Cheung Sha Wan Factory Estate. It comprises three site-oriented domestic blocks and an
ancillary facilities block providing car parks, amenity facilities, elderly centre and the integrated family services centre. Foundation works commenced in 2007 and was completed in 2012.

Demographics
According to the 2016 population by-census, Un Chau Estate has a population of 18,482. 97% of the population is of Chinese ancestry. Median monthly domestic household income is HK$ 14,930.

Houses

Phase 2, 4 and 5 have been offered as alternate public housing for people displaced by the demolition of buildings in nearby So Uk Estate.

See also

 Public housing in Hong Kong
 List of public housing estates in Hong Kong

References

Residential buildings completed in 1998
Residential buildings completed in 1999
Residential buildings completed in 2008
Cheung Sha Wan
Public housing estates in Hong Kong
1999 establishments in Hong Kong